Eta Sigma Delta International Hospitality Management Society ( or ESD) is an international honor society for hospitality students. The organization has about 90 chapters. The International Council on Hotel, Restaurant, and Institutional Education administers the organization.

History
The organization was founded in 1978 by a group of students in the University of New Hampshire's Whittemore School of Business and Economics.

Universities and colleges

Colleges and universities include:
American Military University/American Public University
Angell Business School Freiburg
Angell Akademie Freiberg
Art Institute of Raleigh - Durham
Asheville-Buncombe Technical Community College
Auburn University
Bethune-Cookman University
Boston University
Buffalo State College
California State Polytechnic University - Pomona
California State University, Long Beach
Cesar Ritz Colleges
Cheyney University of Pennsylvania
The Chinese University of Hong Kong
Coastal Carolina University
College of the Ozarks
Columbus State Community College
The Culinary Institute of America
Cuyahoga Community College
Delaware State University
DePaul University
Drexel University
East Carolina University
East Stroudsburg University
Eastern Michigan University
Endicott College
Fairleigh Dickinson University
Ferris State University
Florida International University
Florida Metropolitan University
Florida State University
Fort Hays State University
Georgia Southern University
Georgia State University
Glion Institute of Higher Education
Grayson College
HAAGA-HELIA University of Applied Sciences
HEC Marbella
The Hong Kong Polytechnic University
Husson University
Indiana University of Pennsylvania
Indiana University Purdue University Indianapolis
International Hotel Management Institute Switzerland
Iowa State UniversityJames Madison University
Johnson & Wales University (Charlotte, Denver, Providence and North Miami campuses)
Kansas State University
Kendall College
Kent State University
Lasell College
Le Cordon Bleu College of Culinary Arts, Austin
Le Cordon Bleu College of Culinary Arts, Orlando
Le Cordon Bleu College of Culinary Arts, Pittsburgh
Les Roches Marbella Swiss Hotel Association
Les Roches Marbella International School of Hotel Management
Lynn University
Michigan State University
Mississippi University for Women
Missouri State University
Morrisville State College
Mount Ida College
New Mexico State University
Niagara University
Nicholls State University
North Carolina Central University
Northampton Community College
Oklahoma State University
Paul Smith's College
Pensacola Junior College
Penn State Berks
The Pennsylvania State University
Purdue University
The Restaurant School at Walnut Hill College
Rochester Institute of Technology
Rochester Institute of Technology Croatia
Schiller International University
South Seattle Community College
Southern Illinois University at Carbondale
Southern New Hampshire University
St. Cloud State University
St. Joseph’s College
State University of New York at Plattsburgh
Stephen F. Austin State University
Stockton University
Stratford University
Temple University
Texas Tech University
Troy University
Tuskegee University
University of Alabama
University of Arkansas
University of Central Florida
University of Delaware
University of Hawai'i at Manoa
University of Houston
University of Maryland Eastern Shore
Universities at Shady Grove
University of Massachusetts, Amherst
University of Missouri
University of New Hampshire
University of New Orleans
University of North Texas
Universidad San Ignacio de Loyola
University of South Carolina
University of Southern Maine
University of New Haven
University of Nevada - Las Vegas
Utah Valley University
Virginia Tech
Virginia State University
Washington State University
Western Carolina University
Widener University
Wor-Wic Community College
York College of Pennsylvania

References

External links
 International Council on Hotel, Restaurant, and Institutional Education

Student societies in the United States
Honor societies
1978 establishments in New Hampshire
Student organizations established in 1978